KOPR (94.1 FM) is an American commercial radio station licensed to serve the community of Butte, Montana.

KOPR airs the syndicated, "Custom Rock Hits" music format from Jones Radio Networks.  The station has aired an adult hits format for several years.

External links

FCC History Cards for KOPR

OPR
Adult hits radio stations in the United States
Radio stations established in 1972
1972 establishments in Montana